Richard Michael Shaffer (born March 15, 1991) is a retired American professional baseball infielder who is now a live video gaming personality on the streaming platform Twitch, performing under the character name "Dicky Danger". He previously played in Major League Baseball (MLB) for the Tampa Bay Rays. Since retiring from baseball, he has also begun to pursue writing and in October 2020 published his debut novel: The Eight of Earth: A Novel.

Career

Amateur
Shaffer was drafted by the Los Angeles Dodgers in the 25th round of the 2009 Major League Baseball draft out of Providence High School in Charlotte, North Carolina. He did not sign and attended Clemson University. During his college baseball career with the Clemson Tigers, he hit .325/.449/.562 with 30 home runs and 137 runs batted in. In 2011, he played collegiate summer baseball with the Chatham Anglers of the Cape Cod Baseball League.

Tampa Bay Rays
The Tampa Bay Rays selected Shaffer in the first round, with the 25th overall selection, of the 2012 Major League Baseball draft. He made his professional debut for the Hudson Valley Renegades of the Class A-Short Season New York–Penn League, hitting .308/.406/.487 and four home runs in 33 games. In 2013, he played for the Charlotte Stone Crabs of the Class A-Advanced Florida State League, hitting .254/.308/.399 with 11 home runs. He played in the Arizona Fall League after the season. He started the 2014 season for the Montgomery Biscuits of the Class AA Southern League.

Shaffer began the 2015 season with the Biscuits, and received a midseason promotion to the Durham Bulls of the Class AAA International League. On August 3, 2015, the Rays promoted Shaffer to the major leagues. Shaffer ended his 2016 season with a .250 batting average.

Seattle Mariners
On November 18, 2016, the Rays traded Shaffer and Taylor Motter to the Seattle Mariners for Andrew Kittredge, Dalton Kelly and Dylan Thompson. Shaffer was designated for assignment by the Mariners on December 7, after acquiring Chris Heston.

Philadelphia Phillies
The Philadelphia Phillies claimed Shaffer off of waivers on December 14. He was designated for assignment by Philadelphia on December 20.

Cincinnati Reds
The Cincinnati Reds claimed him off waivers from the Phillies on December 23.

Cleveland Indians

Shaffer was claimed off waivers by the Cleveland Indians on January 26, 2017, and then designated for assignment by them on January 30. Shaffer was subsequently outrighted to the minor leagues on February 2, 2017. He was released from the organization on June 6, 2018.

Milwaukee Brewers
Shaffer was signed to a minor league contract with the Milwaukee Brewers on July 20, 2018. After being signed, he was sent to Triple A Colorado Springs Sky Sox. He became a free agent after the season.

High Point Rockers
On April 11, 2019, Shaffer signed with the High Point Rockers of the Atlantic League of Professional Baseball. He became a free agent following the season.

References

External links

Clemson Tigers bio

1991 births
Living people
Baseball players from Charlotte, North Carolina
Tampa Bay Rays players
Clemson Tigers baseball players
Chatham Anglers players
Hudson Valley Renegades players
Phoenix Desert Dogs players
Charlotte Stone Crabs players
Salt River Rafters players
Montgomery Biscuits players
Durham Bulls players
Colorado Springs Sky Sox players
Biloxi Shuckers players
High Point Rockers players